Old Trail School is an independent coeducational day school, serving toddler though grade 8, founded in 1920. It is located in Bath, Ohio, in Cuyahoga Valley National Park. It is the only independent school in the United States that is located in a national park.

Facility 

The school is located on a  campus in Cuyahoga Valley National Park. Old Trail School is the only school in a national park. Alderfer and Sisler-McFawn Halls house the primary grades. Noble Hall and the Wilson Wing house third through eighth grades. Other buildings include the library, administration building, cafeteria, gymnasium, natatorium, swimming pool, and a performing arts center.

Primary school 

Old Trail School's Primary School includes toddler through second grade and is headed by Amanda Irwin.

Intermediate school 

Old Trail School's Intermediate School includes grades 3-5 and is headed by Jon Wanders.

Middle school

Old Trail School's Middle School includes grades 6-8 and is headed by Hallie Ritzman.

The Head of School at Old Trail School is Sarah Johnston.

Newspaper 

Old Trail School's online news-hub, Buffalo News Network, is run by students for students.

References

External links 
Old Trail School Homepage

Education in Summit County, Ohio
Private middle schools in Ohio
Private elementary schools in Ohio
Buildings and structures in Summit County, Ohio